Peta Scholz (born 17 January 1976), also known as Peta Squire, is a former Australia netball international. She was a member of the Australia teams that won the gold medals at the 1999 World Netball Championships and the 2002 Commonwealth Games and the silver medal at the 2003 World Netball Championships. Between 1997 and 2007, Scholz made 169 appearances for Adelaide Thunderbirds in the Commonwealth Bank Trophy league. She was a prominent member of the Thunderbirds teams that won five successive minor premierships between 1997 and 2001. 
She also played in six successive grand finals between 1997 and 2002, helping Thunderbirds win premierships in 1998 and 1999. In 2010 and 2011, Scholz played for Waikato Bay of Plenty Magic in the ANZ Championship.

Early life and family
Squire graduated from Reynella East College in 1992. She is married to David Scholz, a teacher and cricket coach. They have two daughters, Matilda (born c. 2005) and Poppy (born c. 2007).

Playing career

Oakdale
Squire began her netball career with Oakdale. After retiring as an Adelaide Thunderbirds player she returned to Oakdale, as Peta Scholz, and played for them in the South Australia state league. In 2009 she helped Oakdake win their first state league title.

Mobil Superleague
During the Mobil Superleague era, Squire played for both the Australian Institute of Sport and Garville. While playing for the AIS in 1994 she switched from goal defence to wing defence. This would become her regular position throughout her career.

Adelaide Thunderbirds
Between 1997 and 2007, Scholz made 169 appearances for Adelaide Thunderbirds in the Commonwealth Bank Trophy league. She was a prominent member of the Thunderbirds teams that won five successive minor premierships between 1997 and 2001. 
She also played in six successive grand finals between 1997 and 2002, helping Thunderbirds win premierships in 1998 and 1999. In 2002, 2003, 2004 and 2007, she was named in the Margaret Pewtress Team of the Year. Between 2004 and 2006, together with Laura von Bertouch, she co-captained Thundersbirds. In 2006 she played in her 150th Commonwealth Bank Trophy match. She retired as a Thundersbirds player after the 2007 season. Her 169 appearances (649 quarters) was the second highest tally in the Commonwealth Bank Trophy league after Liz Ellis.

Waikato Bay of Plenty Magic
In 2010 and 2011, Scholz played for Waikato Bay of Plenty Magic in the ANZ Championship. She signed for Magic in October 2009 after impressing while playing for a World 7 team in an international test series against New Zealand. On 8 May 2010, during a Round 8 match against Central Pulse, Scholz suffered a season ending injury. She was subsequently replaced in the squad by Jade Clarke. She returned to play for Magic during the 2011 season.

International
Australia
Between 1998 and 2004, Scholz made 54 senior appearances for Australia. She was a member of the Australia team that won the 1996 World Youth Netball Championships. She made her senior debut for Australia on 27 February 1998 against New Zealand. She was subsequently a member of the Australia teams that won the gold medals at the 1999 World Netball Championships and the 2002 Commonwealth Games and the silver medal at the 2003 World Netball Championships.

World 7
In August 2009, Scholz played for a World 7 team, coached by Julie Fitzgerald, that defeated New Zealand 2–1 in an international test series. As winners of the series, the World 7 team were awarded the Taini Jamison Trophy.

Coach
In 2012, Scholz was appointed director of netball at Scotch College.

Honours
Australia
World Netball Championships
Winners: 1999
Runners Up: 2003
Commonwealth Games
Winners: 2002
World 7
Taini Jamison Trophy
Winners: 2009
Adelaide Thunderbirds
Commonwealth Bank Trophy
Winners: 1998, 1999
Runners Up: 1997, 2000, 2001, 2002, 2006
Minor premierships: 1997, 1998, 1999, 2000, 2001
Oakdale
South Australia State League
Winners: 2009

References

Living people
1976 births
Australian netball players
Australia international netball players
Netball players from South Australia
Netball players at the 2002 Commonwealth Games
Commonwealth Games gold medallists for Australia
Commonwealth Games medallists in netball
1999 World Netball Championships players
2003 World Netball Championships players
Australian Institute of Sport netball players
Garville Netball Club players
Adelaide Thunderbirds players
Waikato Bay of Plenty Magic players
South Australia state netball league players
Esso/Mobil Superleague players
Commonwealth Bank Trophy players
ANZ Championship players
Australian expatriate netball people in New Zealand
Australian netball coaches
Medallists at the 2002 Commonwealth Games